Kerwick is a surname. Notable people with the surname include:

Bill Kerwick (1867–1936), Irish hurler
Edward Kerwick (1922–2010), English rugby league player
John Kerwick (1893–?), Australian rugby league player
Pat Kerwick (born 1982), Irish hurler
Tom Kerwick (1885–1929), Irish hurler